Hawaiian Braille is the braille alphabet of the Hawaiian language. It is a subset of the basic braille alphabet,

{| class=wikitable
|- align=center
|||||||||||||||||||||||
|- align=center
|a||e||h||i||k||l||m||n||o||p||u||w
|}

supplemented by an additional letter  to mark long vowels:

{| class=wikitable
|- align=center
|||||||||
|- align=center
|ā||ē||ī||ō||ū
|}

(Māori Braille uses the same convention for long vowels.)

Unlike print Hawaiian, which has a special letter ʻokina for the glottal stop, Hawaiian Braille uses the apostrophe , which behaves as punctuation rather than as a consonant: 

 āina
 Āina

That is, the order to write Ā is apostrophe, cap sign, length sign, A.

Punctuation is as in English Braille.

References

French-ordered braille alphabets
Hawaiian language